Baryplegma coeleste is a species of tephritid or fruit flies in the genus Baryplegma of the family Tephritidae.

Distribution
Bolivia, Paraguay, Brazil.

References

Tephritinae
Insects described in 1914
Diptera of South America